Dead Bang is a 1989 American action thriller film directed by John Frankenheimer and starring Don Johnson, Penelope Ann Miller, William Forsythe, Bob Balaban, and Tim Reid. Johnson's character, based on real-life LASD Detective Jerry Beck, tracks the killer of a Los Angeles County Sheriff's Deputy and uncovers a plot involving hate literature, white supremacist militias and arms trafficking.

Plot
On Christmas Eve in Los Angeles, a dispatched LASD Sheriff is shot dead by an armed robber, who early on robbed a convenience store and also killed its African-American owner. The alcoholic, hard-driven LASD Detective Jerry Beck is tasked with the investigation. While examining police records he comes across a person of interest named Bobby Burns, who has recently been paroled from a four-year robbery sentence. He and a parole officer go to Burns' home only to find his college student brother, John, who claims he has not seen Burns and is only staying for the holidays. A man suddenly flees the house and Beck captures him after a chase on foot; he turns out to be one of Burns' friend who is also on parole from committing armed robbery. The man tells Beck that he last saw Burns driving a maroon Ford Ranch Wagon en route to Bakersfield.

In Cottonwood, Arizona, Burns and his men rob a Mexican bar and kill its patrons. A local police chief informs Beck of the crime and he immediately leaves for Arizona. Beck and the chief head to a ranch alleged to be Burns' hideout, where Burns and his men attack the officers by firing automatic weapons; they escape driving the Ford. Beck retrieves a cache of documents Burns dropped, which contains white supremacy propaganda, maps, and an address book. Beck leaves for Bogan, Oklahoma, to track down one of the people listed in the book, Reverend Gebhardt, who is the leader of the religious white supremacist organization Aryan Nations. Beck is joined by FBI Agent Kressler and they head to Gebhardt's church, where Gebhardt reveals the entity's aim of cleansing America of its "racial impurities", and denies having seen Burns before. Burns, though, has been hiding near the church and casing the place.

That night, Burns springs on Beck while driving his car and holds him at gunpoint. As Burns prepares to shoot him, Beck crashes his car into an oncoming police vehicle to escape. During a gunfight, Beck lights a matchbook and sets a car leaking gas on fire, causing Burns to escape with his men after an explosion. Back in Los Angeles, Beck's superiors have become frustrated over his performance on the force due in part to his alcoholism and uncouth behavior. They recommend he undergo a psychiatric analysis; after the session, though, Beck threatens the psychiatrist into letting him pass the evaluation. A phone call later that day informs him that he is now fit for duty.

In Boulder, Colorado, he meets Police Captain Dixon, who entrusts his team of black men on the force to track Burns. Along with Kressler, he and Dixon head to a paramilitary training camp which is owned by the Aryan Nations, and ambush Gebhardt and the other members. His search for Burns yields no results, which causes hostility between him and Kressler. Beck, though, discovers a concealed door that leads to a bunker. A gunfight ensues between him and Burns; Beck shoots and fatally wounds him. As he lay dying, Burns reveals that he did not kill the Los Angeles cop. John emerges from behind and, as he prepares to shoot Beck and Kressler, confesses that it was he who shot the cop to show his brother that he shared his contempt against the police and fidelity to white supremacy. Beck hurls John insults about his brother, and John reciprocates by opening fire at him. When John runs out of bullets and springs from cover, Beck shoots him dead.

At a press conference, Dixon informs that the FBI will be revising its position on white supremacy groups, and he credits Kressler with the success of the investigation owing to the evidence the agent gathered. Outside, Dixon and Beck befriend one another and go their separate ways.

Cast

 Don Johnson as LASD Detective Jerry Beck
 Penelope Ann Miller as Linda Kimble
 William Forsythe as FBI Special Agent Arthur Kressler
 Bob Balaban as Elliott Webley
 Frank Military as Robert "Bobby" Burns
 Tate Donovan as John Burns
 Antoni Stutz as Ray
 Mickey Jones as Sleepy
 Ron Campbell as Crossfield
 William Traylor as Chief Elton Tremmel
 Hy Anzell as Captain Waxman
 Michael Jeter as Dr. Alexander Krantz
 Tim Reid as Chief Dixon
 James B. Douglas as Agent Gilroy
 Brad Sullivan as Chief Hillard

Production
"Jerome Beck" is listed in the film's closing credits as walk-on character Detective John, and also as the film's technical police advisor. Beck was a Los Angeles County Sheriff's Department detective who sold the film rights to his life to Frankenheimer after meeting him. Don Johnson later recalled:
That was amazing, because it was a real-life character. It was an actual cop, and he wrote the script. John Frankenheimer was the director... and I was excited to work with him. Jerry was a homicide cop in L.A., and he had curly hair, so I permed my hair, which was a, uh, very interesting choice. Because I kind of looked like a… It's kind of odd. I don't really know how to describe it. I don't know if you know a lot about perms, but if you do them, they relax after about two or three weeks. So my hair goes through these amazing transitions of being really tight and really wavy and sort of goofy-looking. [Laughs.]
According to director Frankenheimer, Connie Sellecca was originally chosen for the part that went to Penelope Ann Miller. Johnson refused to work with Sellecca, so she was fired and paid off.

Production was designed by Ken Adam. Director of Photography was Gerry Fisher. Music was by Gary Chang.

Principal photography began on April 14, 1988, in Alberta. Shooting locations included Calgary, Drumheller, and High River. The final three weeks of filming took place in Los Angeles.

References

External links

1989 films
1989 action thriller films
American police detective films
Films directed by John Frankenheimer
Films scored by Gary Chang
1980s English-language films
American action thriller films
Warner Bros. films
Films about racism
Films set in Arizona
Films set in Colorado
Films set in Los Angeles
Films set in Oklahoma
Films shot in Alberta
Films shot in Los Angeles
1980s police procedural films
Films shot in Calgary
Films set in Yavapai County, Arizona
1980s American films